Portuguese Uruguayans are Uruguayans of full or partial Portuguese ancestry.

The Portuguese arrived in Uruguay around the time of the Spanish colonial period. Many of them were sailors, conquistadors, clergy, and members of the military. Later Portuguese arrivals included pirates in conflict with Spanish leadership; Colonia del Sacramento, which eventually turned into a regional center of smuggling, is a notable example of those ages

Another source of Portuguese immigration into Uruguay were Brazilians of Portuguese descent, who crossed the border into the country ever since it became independent.

During the second half of the 19th century and part of the 20th, several additional Portuguese immigrants arrived; the last wave was during 1930–1965. The most recent figure is from the 2011 Uruguayan census, which revealed 367 people who declared Portugal as their country of birth while is estimated that there are at least some 2,985 Portuguese citizens residing in Uruguay as of 2020.

Notable people
past
Enrique Almada (1934-1990), comedian and actor
Enrique Amorim (1900–1960), writer
Fernando O. Assunção (1931–2006), ethnologist and folklorist
Wilson Ferreira Aldunate (1919–1988), politician
Manuel Flores Mora (1923–1984), politician and journalist
Eudoro Melo (1889–1975), poet
Alceu Ribeiro (1919-2013), painter
Aparicio Saravia (1856–1904), political leader
Villanueva Saravia (1964–1998), mayor of Cerro Largo
Olhinto María Simoes (1901–1966), poet and journalist
Amílcar Vasconcellos (1915–1999), lawyer and politician
Carlos Vaz Ferreira (1872–1958), philosopher
María Eugenia Vaz Ferreira (1875–1924), poet
present
José Amorín (born 1954 in Montevideo), politician
Adrián Caetano (born 1969 in Montevideo), film director
Maika Ceres (born 1986 in Montevideo), soprano
Mónica Farro (born 1976 in Montevideo), vedette
Beatriz Flores Silva (born 1956 in Montevideo), film director
Manuel Flores Silva (born 1950 in Montevideo), politician and journalist
José Luis Pintos Saldanha (born 1964 in Artigas), footballer
Sebastián Abreu (born 1976 in Minas), footballer
Mario Regueiro (born 1978 in Montevideo), footballer
Diana Saravia Olmos, notary and politician
Fernando Vilar (born 1954 in Portugal), newsanchor and journalist
Lucas Torreira (born 1996 in Fray Bentos), footballer

See also

Portugal–Uruguay relations
Portuguese conquest of the Banda Oriental
Brazilian immigration to Uruguay

References

Uruguay
Ethnic groups in Uruguay
Immigration to Uruguay
Portugal–Uruguay relations
European Uruguayan